Clíodhna Ní Lionáin (born Coolgreaney, County Wexford, Ireland) is an Irish archaeologist. She was lead archaeologist for the Devinish project Dowth Hall in July 2018 that discovered a 5,500-year-old passage tomb Megalithic passage tomb, near both Dowth and Newgrange.

Ní Lionáin described the discovery as "truly the find of a lifetime".

References

Sources
 Coolgreany's Clíodhna leads dig of immense importance Bray People
 Clíodhna Ní Lionáin Humanities Institute | UCD Humanities Institute (HI)

20th-century Irish historians
21st-century Irish historians
Irish archaeologists
People from County Meath
Year of birth missing (living people)
Living people
Irish women archaeologists